Jeremy "Opie" Lade (born January 6, 1981) is an American Paralympic wheelchair basketball player and head coach from Oconto, Wisconsin. He was injured in a car accident at age 8, and  attended his first wheelchair sports camp at the age of 13 at UW-Whitewater. He is a two-time Parapan American Games gold medalist in both 2007 and 2011. In 2002, he won a gold medal at IWBF World Championship and in 2006 won a silver one from the same place. Six years later, he was awarded a bronze medal for his participation at the 2012 Summer Paralympics and is currently employed as a head coach at the University of Wisconsin–Whitewater. From 2005 to 2008 he  coached Milwaukee Wizards and led them to a Junior National Championship. In his spare time he likes to watch Green Bay Packers, Milwaukee Bucks, and Milwaukee Brewers with Michael Jordan being his favorite athlete.

References

External links
 
 

1981 births
Living people
Paralympic wheelchair basketball players of the United States
Paralympic bronze medalists for the United States
American men's wheelchair basketball players
Paralympic medalists in wheelchair basketball
Wheelchair basketball players at the 2012 Summer Paralympics
Medalists at the 2012 Summer Paralympics
People from Oconto, Wisconsin
Basketball players from Wisconsin
21st-century American people